is a Japanese former professional sumo wrestler from Matsusaka, Mie. His sumo stable was Kise (for a short time he belonged to Kitanoumi). His height is 193 cm (6 ft 4 in) and his peak weight is 224 kg (494 lbs). His highest rank was jūryō 6. Hs is the first former amateur from Asahi University to reach the sekitori ranks. He retired in June 2020.

Career

From elementary school he did karate, but he became interested in sumo at Mie High School and began entering sumo competitions. He was an amateur wrestler at Asahi University and reached the top 16 in the Inter Collegiate and second place in the Western Japan College Tournament. He was a contemporary of Tosayutaka. He joined Kise stable in March 2007 at the age of 23. He was only the third former member of Asahi University's small sumo club to turn professional. He weighed  upon his debut. He initially fought under his own surname of Shiratsuka. In March 2009 he switched to the shikona of Tokushinhō and won the makushita division championship or yūshō with a 6–1 record. He was promoted to the jūryō division for the first time in September 2009. He spent a total of 27 tournaments ranked in jūryō with a win/loss record of 187–218. He never reached the top makuuchi division; his highest rank being jūryō 6 in September 2013. His last appearance in jūryō was in November 2015.

His peak weight of 224 kilograms (494 lbs) means he ranks twelfth in the list of heaviest sumo wrestlers, and is the sixth-heaviest Japanese sumo wrestler ever after Yamamotoyama, Kenho, Susanoumi, Kainowaka and Hidenoumi.

Retirement from sumo
Tokushinhō fell to the sandanme division in the banzuke issued for the May 2020 tournament, and he submitted retirement papers to the Japan Sumo Association, acknowledged on June 1, 2020. His career results were 382 wins against 373 losses over 79 tournaments. He plans to return to Asahi University as a member of staff. He had his danpatsu-shiki or retirement ceremony in October 2021, with around 150 guests including former yokozuna Kisenosato, and the head of Asahi University making the final cut of his topknot.

Fighting style
When fighting on the mawashi or belt Tokushinhō favoured a migi-yotsu (left hand outside, right hand inside) grip. He also regularly used tsuki/oshi (pushing and thrusting) techniques. His most common winning kimarite were yori kiri (force out) and oshi dashi (push out), which together account for over 60 per cent of his career wins.

Career record

See also
 Glossary of sumo terms
 List of past sumo wrestlers

References

External links
 

1984 births
Living people
Japanese sumo wrestlers
Sumo people from Mie Prefecture